Kapahei "Judge" Kauai ( – August 1, 1893), also known as the "Arch-Leper" (a play on "Archbishop") was a judge and leper organizer.

In the late 1880s he found he had contracted leprosy and fled to Kalalau Valley leading a number of other lepers. Following the Overthrow of the Hawaiian Kingdom, the Provisional Government forcibly relocated many lepers. In 1893 deputy sheriff Louis H. Stolz attempted to capture the lepers but was shot and killed by Kaluai Koolau. Kauai organized the colony members for the repercussions. On July 1, the Waialeale landed troops.  At the age of 68 and crippled by the disease, Kauai attempted to hide from the soldiers by crawling under his bed.  He was the first one found and pulled out by his feet and deported to Kalaupapa.

References

Bibliography

1820s births
1893 deaths
History of Hawaii
Members of the Hawaiian Kingdom House of Representatives
Queen Emma Party politicians
Punahou School alumni
Native Hawaiian politicians
Native Hawaiian people
Leprosy activists
People from Kauai
People from Maui